Air Force, Incorporated is a 2006 Argentine documentary film written and directed by Enrique Piñeyro.  The picture was executive produced by Aqua Films' Verónica Cura and produced by Enrique Piñeyro.

Synopsis
The documentary portrays a behind-the-scenes look at the poor state of Argentina's civil aviation, and puts the blame on the Argentine Air Force.  The Air Force has been in control of air traffic operations since the military takeover of General Juan Carlos Onganía in 1966.

The producer/director, Enrique Piñeyro, claims Argentina and Nigeria are the only countries whose air force controls and regulates the airline industry.

Piñeyro, a former Argentine airline pilot, makes his case in the documentary using diagrams, 3D animations, interviews, hidden cameras in the control tower, and a few props.  For example, at one point he spills out a bag of plastic airplanes and equates it to the number of planes the air force has lost due to negligence.

The film is heavily based on the Austral Líneas Aéreas Flight 2553 plane crash.

Enrique Piñeyro takes his camera, secretly, into the control tower of the Ministro Pistarini International Airport also-known-as Ezeiza, the international airport at Buenos Aires.

Background
The basis of the documentary was Enrique Piñeyro's experiences in the Argentine aviation industry.  Piñeyro was an airline pilot from 1988 to 1999, and resigned in June 1999.

This is not the first documentary portraying the Argentine airline industry. In 2004 he wrote, directed, and produced Whisky Romeo Zulu, a film that depicted the general corrosive deregulation, greedy cost-cutting corporations, and corrupt government officials, found in the Argentine airline industry.

References

External links

 
 Fuerza aérea sociedad anónima at cinenacional.com 
 Fuerza aérea sociedad anónima at Cineismo 

2006 films
2006 documentary films
Argentine documentary films
Films about air forces
Documentary films about Argentina
Documentary films about aviation
Documentary films about politics
Argentine independent films
2000s Spanish-language films
Aviation in Argentina
2006 independent films
2000s Argentine films